The Irish R.M. is a trilogy of books by the Anglo-Irish novelists Somerville and Ross and a 1983 television comedy-drama series based on them. They are set in the turn-of-the-twentieth-century west of Ireland.

Books

The television series is based on stories drawn from:
 Some Experiences of an Irish R.M. (Longmans, Green & Co., London, 1899)
 Further Experiences of an Irish R.M. (Longmans Green & Co., London, 1908)
 In Mr Knox's Country (Longmans Green & Co., London, 1915)

All three books are in the public domain and can be accessed and used without royalty. The various stories concern the life of an Irish ex-British Army officer, Major Sinclair Yeates, recently appointed a Resident Magistrate (R.M.) in Ireland, when the entire island was still part of the United Kingdom. In the television series the Major is English and has previously spent little or no time in Ireland.

Filming 
A television series based on the books was made in the 1980s, and was filmed in Ireland at locations in Kildare and Wicklow with additional locations in the west of Ireland in a co-production between Ulster Television and Raidió Teilifís Éireann. It was broadcast on Channel 4 and S4C in the United Kingdom, and RTÉ One in the Republic of Ireland. Like the books, the television series is a number of short stories around a few central characters.

Director Roy Ward Baker said it was "beautifully done."

Morristown Lattin – the house used as Aussolas Castle, the residence of Beryl Reid's incarnation of the erstwhile Mrs Knox (located at Newhall, Naas in County Kildare), was badly damaged by fire following completion of filming for the series. It has since been repaired.

Johnstown Kennedy – the house used as Major Yeates' residence, Shreelane House –  was situated near Rathcoole, County Dublin.  The extensive outbuildings were transformed into shops and pubs for some of the village scenes. The house was demolished soon after the third series was completed and a golf course now stands on the site.  The design of the course preserved the large number of mature trees, and in addition the house's date stone and a number of other items are on display.

Furness House, near Naas, was used as Castle Knox, the home of Sir Valentine and Lady Knox and their daughter Sally.

For the second and third series, many of the Skebawn village scenes were filmed in Robertstown.

Plot 
Major Yeates (Peter Bowles) is portrayed as an Englishman, and much of the humour of the first series derives from his difficulty in adjusting to the more relaxed class boundaries and slower pace of life of rural Ireland. The timeline of the television series begins in 1897, when the Major departs for Ireland, and ends shortly after the death of Edward VII.

The R.M. has to deal with all sorts of everyday events with colourful characters, often being outfoxed by the machinations of his Anglo-Irish friend, Flurry Knox (Bryan Murray). Anna Manahan played the redoubtable housekeeper, Mrs Cadogan, while Virginia Cole played Bridget.

Themes 
Political references are, however, not completely absent; where they occur, they are invariably introduced in a subtle manner by guest characters. Notable among these are several visiting officials from Dublin Castle who regard the Major's dispensation of justice as unduly lenient, and a Catholic canon with strong Irish nationalist sympathies who exploits the naivety of the Major for his own purposes. In every case, the comfortable, if somewhat adversarial, co-existence of the Major and the local population is at risk. One element of the series' humour involves the efforts of Flurry and the Major to hasten the departure of these troublesome visitors.

One of the show's key strengths lies in its ability to convey the extent to which the lives of the Anglo-Irish gentry and the simple, if rather stilted local characters, often became inadvertently intertwined to produce the memorable comic effects that are so unique to the Irish psyche.

Episodes

Series 1 (1983)

Series 2 (1984)

Series 3 (1985)

Home media
All three series of The Irish R.M. were issued on DVD in the UK, distributed by Acorn Media UK.  The DVD also includes an Ulster TV documentary about the filming of the first series. There are two slideshows, one of profiles of the lead actors and the other sample recipes from Mrs Cadogan's Cookbook.

References

External links
 
 Irish R.M. books on Internet Archive
 

1983 British television series debuts
1985 British television series endings
1980s British comedy-drama television series
1980s British legal television series
RTÉ original programming
Channel 4 television dramas
Irish comedy-drama television series
British comedy-drama television shows
Irish legal television series
Period television series
Television series by ITV Studios
English-language television shows
Television shows produced by Ulster Television